Capital City Academy (commonly abbreviated to CCA) is a specialist sports and arts Academy in Willesden, North West London, in the borough of Brent.

Design

The School was designed by architect Sir Norman Foster and engineers Buro Happold, and is sponsored by Sir Frank Lowe. Capital City Academy was built to replace its predecessor Willesden High School. Its buildings on the high school's playing fields were first used in 2003 and officially opened on 12 June 2003.

Location
It is situated near Willesden Sports Stadium and King Edward VII Sports Ground. Although near Willesden Green, the school is in the parish of All Souls, Willesden. The school is located not far from Roundwood Park.

History
The school began as Willesden County School, on Uffington Road (off Doyle Gardens) in 1924 and the buildings were extended in 1932. In September 1940, a bomb destroyed four classrooms; a V-1 flying bomb landed nearby in 1944 at the junction of Doyle Gardens and All Souls Avenue. Following the Education Act 1944, it became Willesden County Grammar School in 1947; one of five grammar schools run by the Willesden Education Committee.  one of five grammar schools run by the Willesden Education Committee. For one year in 1966 it became Willesden Grammar-Technical School when it amalgamated with Willesden School of Engineering in Goodson Road earlier known as Leopold Road Comprehensive. In September 1967, it joined with Pound Lane School on Pound Lane to become a comprehensive school known as Willesden High School. In 2003, it became one of the first three academies in England, with the aim of attempting  to overcome educational underachievement in deprived areas. At the time, Willesden High School had some of the worst GCSE results in the UK.

Notable visits
Former UK Prime Minister Tony Blair opened the Academy. Frank McCourt the Pulitzer Prize-winning author of Angela's Ashes visited and signed copies of his books for the Gifted education group of students, reviewing the Carnegie Medal and Kate Greenaway Medal nominations of the year.

CCA in Media

The Children
The Children was a TV Mini Series aired on ITV in September 2008. The main character was a headteacher played by Inspector Morse actor, Kevin Whately. The scenes set at his school were filmed in the academy, with actual students, as extras.

Teachers TV
The Academy has been filmed for Teachers TV a number of times most notably in its first two years. where it goes into depth about the school on the original site of the Academy, Willesden High School.

Sports Hall
The Academy's main sports hall is home to the PAWS London Capital basketball team, one of the leading clubs based in the capital city. Having recently featured in the British Basketball League for three years, the Caps currently compete in Division 1 of the English Basketball League.

Alumni

Capital City Academy
 Ricardo P. Lloyd, British actor

Wilesden High School
 Dave Beasant, goalkeeper
 Luther Blissett, striker with Watford
 Phillip DeFreitas, cricketer, fast bowler for England
 Shane Richie, Alfie Moon in EastEnders, former husband of Coleen Nolan
 Eugene Ankomah, Contemporary visual artist

Willesden County Grammar School

 Gerry Anderson, renowned animator and creator of Thunderbirds (TV series)
 Roy Battersby, television director
 Les Buck, General Secretary from 1962-77 of the National Union of Sheet Metal Workers, Coppersmiths, Heating and Domestic Engineers
 Stuart Carne CBE, GP
 Carl Cushnie, first black entrepreneur to enter Britain's richest 500 people (number 312) in 1998, becoming Britain's richest black businessman, sentenced for six years for fraud.
 Liz Gebhardt, actress
 Ron Goodwin (briefly), renowned composer of soundtracks such as Those Magnificent Men in their Flying Machines and 633 Squadron
 Norman Hudis, screenwriter who wrote the first six Carry On films, and established the franchise
 Gary Locke (English footballer), full back for Chelsea
 John Neville CM OBE, actor who starred in Terry Gilliam's The Adventures of Baron Munchausen
 Molly Parkin, fashion writer and novelist
 Prof Graham Warren FRS, Professor of Cell Biology from 1999-2007 at Yale School of Medicine, and Principal Scientist from 1989-99 of the Imperial Cancer Research Fund

Former teachers
 Max Morris, headteacher from 1966-78 of Willesden High School and President of the NUT from 1973–74

References

External links

 School website
 
 Former Willesden County Grammar School
 EduBase

Academies in the London Borough of Brent
Educational institutions established in 2003
Secondary schools in the London Borough of Brent
2003 establishments in England
Specialist arts colleges in England
Specialist sports colleges in England